Zhongshan Park, formerly called Jessfield Park and Zhaofeng Park, is a park in Changning District, Shanghai, China. The park has a large collection of trees and flowers. People fly kites and play sport games on the large meadow areas.

Location
The park is located centrally in the Changning District. To the north is Suzhou Creek and the East China University of Politics and Law. There is a large shopping mall with a tall skyscraper above, Cloud Nine, southwest of the park.

History
Zhongshan Park was established in 1914 by the Shanghai Municipal Council as Jessfield Park (極司非爾花園), after Jessfield Road (now Wanhangdu Road) which led to the park. The park was in the extra-settlement roads area beyond the formal boundaries of the Shanghai International Settlement but was administered by the Settlement's authority, the Shanghai Municipal Council. 

Before the property became a public park, it was the southern half of a private garden owned by H. Fogg, a British property developer. The northern half of Hogg's property was sold to the Episcopal Church to build St John's University. Thus, the park was also popularly known as "Zhaofeng Garden" (兆豐花園), after the Chinese name of Hogg's firm Jenner Hogg & Co. It was renamed "Zhongshan Park" in honor of Dr. Sun Yat-sen in 1944.

Transportation
The park can be reached via the Shanghai Metro Line 2, Line 3 or Line 4 to Zhongshan Park Station. It is northwest of the station, with an entrance south of Suzhou Creek.

See also
Changfeng Park, to the northwest
Cloud Nine shopping mall, to the southwest
Suzhou Creek, to the north
Zhongshan Park (Shanghai Metro), to the southwest

References

External links

Shanghai Zhongshan Park in Sun Yat-sen Parks in the World, publicly accessible with info on 106 parks, provided by Hong Kong Baptist University Library

1914 establishments in China
Parks in Shanghai
Urban public parks
Sun Yat-sen
Changning District